Encounters: The Hidden Truth is an hour-long TV series that featured real life stories of paranormal phenomena. The format featured a host (John Marshall) and a team of reporters presenting 3 or 4 stories per episode dealing with UFOs, crop circles, exorcism, prophets, psychics, reincarnation, and other supernatural phenomena, in a news/documentary film style. The stories unfolded through witness interviews and reenactments of the events. The host and reporters discussed their reactions to some of the stories.

Encounters aired on the Fox network and was used mainly as a summer replacement series and fill-in show for other canceled series. The show first aired Fridays at 8:00 pm during the summer of 1994. The show then aired sporadically with different nights and times. In the final 3 editions of the show, Steven Williams (The X-Files) replaced John Marshall as the host. Two of those episodes aired in November 1995 and the final episode aired on January 23, 1996.

Cast
John Marshall - Host
Russell Rhodes - Correspondent
Sandra Pinckney - Correspondent
Sandra Gin - Correspondent
Linda Deleray - Correspondent
Mark Thompson - Correspondent
Vincent Neill - Director
Steven Williams - Host, Season 3

Broadcast history

Episodes

Special (1994)

Season 1 (1994)

Season 2 (1994-1995)

Season 3 (1995-1996)

Releases
Encounters: The Hidden Truth has yet to be released on DVD or Blu-ray through Fox.

References

External links

1994 American television series debuts
1996 American television series endings
UFO-related television
Fox Broadcasting Company original programming
Paranormal television